Amanda "Mandy" Wainwright (born 24 March 1976) is a British former professional tennis player.

Biography
Wainwright grew up in the county of Essex, attending Bancroft's School in Woodford Green.

A right-handed player, Wainwright made her Wimbledon debut in 1993 and upset Caroline Kuhlman, the world number 78, in the first round. She didn't progress past the opening round in her two other singles main draw appearances at Wimbledon and was more successful on tour as a doubles player, ranked as high as 95 in the world.

Wainwright has now returned to Bancroft's School in Woodford Green as a history teacher and Head of Tennis.

ITF circuit finals

Singles (1–2)

Doubles (6–11)

References

External links
 
 

1976 births
Living people
British female tennis players
Tennis people from Essex
English female tennis players